Gregory Chimera is an American college football coach. He is the head football coach at Johns Hopkins University in Baltimore, a position he has held since the 2019 season.

Personal life and education
Chimera graduated from Johns Hopkins University (JHU) in 2009 with a degree in psychological and brain sciences and a minor in entrepreneurship and management. During his time at JHU, he was a fullback for the Johns Hopkins Blue Jays football team and totalled two receptions for 30 yards as a senior. Prior to graduating, he was inducted into the National Football Foundation's Hampshire Honor Society.

Career
Chimera returned to his alma mater in 2014 to serve as the team's offensive coordinator. Following the passing of Jim Margraff in 2019, Chimera was appointed interim head coach of Johns Hopkins Blue Jays football.  On February 22, 2019, Chimera was officially promoted to the 27th head coach in school history. In his debut game as head coach, the Blue Jays beat the Randolph–Macon Yellow Jackets 17–12. Chimera guided the Blue Jays to an 8–3 record in his first season, the most wins ever recorded by a first-year Johns Hopkins coach. He also became the first Johns Hopkins head coach in 99 years to earn a win in his debut.

Head coaching record

References

External links
 Johns Hopkins profile

Year of birth missing (living people)
Living people
American football fullbacks
Johns Hopkins Blue Jays football coaches
Johns Hopkins Blue Jays football players
People from Gaithersburg, Maryland
Coaches of American football from Maryland
Players of American football from Maryland